Henry Fry may refer to:

 Henry Fry (merchant) (1826–1896), ship-broker, ship owner and commission merchant
 Henry Fry (anthropologist) (1886–1959), Australian physician and anthropologist
 Henry Clay Fry (1840–1929), American entrepreneur in the glass industry 
 Henry Fry (politician) (1826–1892), Canadian MLA for Cowichan

See also
 Henry Frye (born 1932), previous chief justice North Carolina Supreme Court